Dehargaha is a village in the northern union territory of Jammu and Kashmir, India. It is located in the Akhnoor taluk of Jammu district.

References

Villages in Jammu district